Programmed cell death protein 7 is a protein that in humans is encoded by the PDCD7 gene.

This gene encodes a protein with sequence similarity to a mouse protein originally identified in embryonic stem cells. In mouse T-cell lines, this protein appears to be related to glucocorticoid- and staurine-induced apoptotic pathways, and to be linked to ceramide-mediated signalling. These observations suggest that this gene product is involved in specific apoptotic processes in T-cells.

References

Further reading

External links